The OTI Festival 1980 was the ninth edition of the annual OTI Festival. It was held in Buenos Aires, Argentina, following the country's victory at the 1979 contest with the song "Cuenta conmigo" by Daniel Ríolobos. Organised by the Organización de Televisión Iberoamericana (OTI) and host broadcasters Canal 7 and Canal 13, the contest was held at the 1049-seat Martín Coronado room of the Teatro General San Martín on Saturday 15 November 1980 and was hosted by Antonio Carrizo and Liliana López Foresi.

In this edition the number of participating countries reached a new record of 23 delegations, the winner was the performer of Puerto Rico, Rafael José, who had previously represented his country back in 1978. The winning song was "Contigo mujer" (With you woman).

Background 
According to the original rules of the OTI festival, the winning country of the previous year would organise the next edition, a rule that had to be removed in 1978 due to the civil war in Nicaragua, since then, the host city of the festival was decided in a draw organised by the Iberoamerican Television Organisation for the following two year. However, that original rule was re-established because of the Argentine victory of the previous edition by the bolero singer Daniel Riolobos and his song "Cuenta conmigo" (Count with me) and also because of the willingness of the participating Argentinian broadcasters: Canal 7 and Canal 13 to host and to organise the contest.

Naturally, both host broadcasters agreed, after a meeting, to host the festival in Buenos Aires.

Venue 

Canal 7 and Canal 13, the Argentine privately owned OTI full member broadcasters agreed to organise the festival in the Martin Coronado Room of the Teatro General San Martín, in downtown Buenos Aires. This theatre is one of the oldest in the capital city of Argentina. The planification of the building dates back to 1908, but the project could not go forward because of the dislike of the government. Many years later, in 1936, the project returned to prominence thanks to the intendent Mariano de Vedia y Mitre. Anyway, the project and its concession was paralysed again in 1943 when a coup d'état took place in Argentina.

After facing many problems, the construction of the Teatro General San Martín started and was definitively inaugurated in 1960 but started operating one year later.

Since its opening, this building has hosted many theatre related events apart from concerts and ballet shows. The popularity of this venue inside and outside Argentina is so big that nowadays it is considered one of the best cultural centres in Latin America. In fact, this room has attracted many popular performers from all the Spanish speaking world.

The Teatro General San Martín has got many rooms and the biggest one with 1049 seats was the one that was chosen as the definitive venue of this edition of the OTI Festival.

Participating countries 
After the last record of participating countries that was reached in Madrid three years before when 21 countries participated, in this IX edition of the festival the contest reaches a new record of 23 countries with their respective member broadcasters sending their delegations to Buenos Aires. There were no debuting countries, but some of the countries that had withdrawed in previous editions, made their return to the festival.

One of the most interesting facts of this edition was the return of Nicaragua. The last participation of this Central American country took place in 1977 in Madrid getting the victory with Eduardo Gonzalez and his song "Quincho Barrilete" (Quincho, the boy of the little barrel). After that, their participating broadcaster was forced to withdraw because of the tough situation in the country.

Another interesting return is Bolivia. The andean country's last participation was in the edition of 1975 in San Juan, Puerto Rico, with the not very fortunate entry by Óscar Roca. Since then, the country withdrew mainly because of the disappointing places and to diplomatic problems with the neighbouring countries such as Chile. With the return of the Bolivian broadcaster to the festival, Susana Joffré was the singer who defended the Bolivian colors in the contest.

Participating performers 

It must be taken into account the participation of Carlos Mejía Godoy, a widely renowned composer famous in Latin-America and Spain who composed the song “Quincho Barrilete”, the winning song in the edition of 1977 in Madrid. The song which with he and his band Los de Palancagüina won the national selection was "La chavalita de España" (The little girl from Spain).

Another famous participant was the Spaniard Dyango, who was internally selected by RTVE to represent Spain with his song “Querer y perder” (To love and to lose) which received critical acclaim since his selection.

The most acclaimed performer in this year's edition from the very start was the Puerto Rican Rafael José, who was selected by Telemundo in order to represent the Caribbean island. Rafael José had already represented his country in the edition of 1978 which was held in Santiago, Chile getting for his country a more than respectable fourth place with his song “Háblame” (Talk to me).

The song that Rafael José defended this year in the OTI Festival was entitled “Contigo Mujer” (With you woman) which was composed by the prominent Ednita Nazario, who represented Puerto Rico in the previous edition of the OTI Festival in Caracas achieving a notorious fifth place.

The Portuguese entrant in this new edition of the festival was another former Eurovision contestant, in this case Simone de Oliveira, who had previously represented Portugal in the Eurovision Song Contest back in 1969. In this edition of the OTI Festival, Oliveira performed the song “A tua espera” (Your wait) which received a mild welcome.

The host contestant who represented Argentina was Luis Ordoñez, who performed the song “Dime adiós” (Say goodbye), which was one of the favourites to win again the festival.

In México, Televisa organised as usual their massively successful national final, the National OTI Contest to select their entrant to Buenos Aires. In this case, the winner was the male singer José Roberto, who represented his country with the song “Sólo te amo a ti” (You are the only one I love).

Another return to the OTI Festival was made by the Honduran delegation who selected again the performer Moisés Canelo as their representative. Canelo was the very first Honduran entrant in the OTI Festival back in 1974 in the Mexican coastal city of Acapulco getting for his country a respectable ninth place with the song “Río viejo río amigo” (Old river, friend river). In this edition of the festival, Canelo performed the song “Tú, siempre tú” (You, always you), which received a warmer welcome compared to his previous entry.

The Dominican entrant was Fausto Rey, who was selected by Telesistema11 in order to represent his country in Buenos Aires with his song “Canción de un hombre simple” (Song of a simple minded man).

Presenters 
The event was presented by the popular TV news journalists Antonio Carrizo and Liliana López Foresi. As usual both presenters gave an introductory speech highlighting the main goals of the Iberoamerican Television Organisation (OTI) as a contents exchange platform and those of the OTI Festival as a song contest. The speech, as always was given both in Spanish and Portuguese languages.

After that, the presenters gave little presentation speeches before the participating performers took the stage. After the performance round, during the voting process, the presenters contacted with the TV studios of the participating broadcasters in order to know the decision of the jurors. The judges of Argentina, were located in one of the two participating broadcaster's studios.

Running order 
As happened from the inaugural edition in Madrid in 1972 and in the following ones, the host broadcaster, in this case Canal 7 and Canal 13, in collaboration with the Iberoamerican Television Organisation (OTI) organised a draw in Buenos Aires few days before the event took place.

Chile was the country that opened the performance round with the singer Nino García and his song “Sin razón” (Without reason), which did not enjoy much popular acclaim.

Argentina, the host country, represented by Luís Ordoñez with his composition “Dime Adiós” (Say goodbye) was the third country to take the stage enjoying the support from the local audience and by the national juries.

The Spaniard, Dyango, one of the favourite ones with “Querer y perder” (To love and to lose) was the thirteenth performer who appeared on stage in Buenos Aires with received a lot of support in the betting odds.

Another favourite, Fausto Rey, who represented the Dominican Republic during the night was the 20th singer who entered the stage while the Ecuadorian female singer Jeaneth Salgado, with her song “En un instante” (In a moment) was the artist who ended the performance round.

Voting system 
The voting system followed the same dynamics of the previous years since the inaugural edition in which the national juries were contacted by telephone by the presenters. Each participating country had seven jurors. The jurors elected, each one, only their favourite song among the participating entries. The scoreboard was located in the left wall of the music hall.

The national juries of every participating country were contacted directly by telephone by the presenters from the Teatro General San Martín in order to know the decision of the jurors. The jury members of the host country, Argentina, were located in one the central studios of the two Argentine participating broadcasters.

Result 
The favourite Puerto Rican singer and the winner of this year's event was Rafael José with his song “Contigo Mujer” which got the victory with 36 points, 4 points of difference with the Spanish representative Dyango, who came second with 32 points.

Luis Ordoñez, the host contestant got the third position in the festival for Argentina with 31 points. Only one point of difference with the Spaniard contestant.

There was a tie between the Brazilian contestant, Marcia, who defended the song “Convite ao vento” and Ricardo Padilla the representative from Costa Rica with the song “El amor se va” (Love goes away). Both entries were tied in the fourth place with 29 points.

There was another tie in the seventh place between Moisés Canelo, the Honduran contestant with his song “Tú, siempre tú” and the Uruguayan performer Juca Sheppard, who sung the composition “Te lo quedé diciendo” (I was telling it to you). Both candidates got 22 points by the international juries.

Mexico, another favourite to the victory did not get the expected success and the singer José Roberto, conformed himself with the eighth place with 21 points.

For first time after 1977 more than one country ended in the last place with zero points. The performers from the Netherlands Antilles and the returning Bolivia, represented by Lituina Bay and Susana Foret respectively scored no points during the voting process.

Impact 
The Victory of the Puerto Rican performer Rafael José, who is a licensed dentist apart from a singer, was seen in his home country as another milestone in the national musical scene to the point that it is even said that the festival paralysed the country and made the audience forget the protests that took place because of a national electoral process that was overshadowed by a possible fraud. As happened five years before with Nidia Caro, the previous Puerto Rican OTI winner. Rafael José and the composer of his entry, Ednita Nazario were received by a huge crowd at his return to San Juan.

The second place of the Spaniard Dyango consolidated his already long career and also his position as one of the most important musicians in the Spanish national pop scene.

The host Contestant Luis Ordoñez had already a long career in Argentina. In fact, he debuted in 1956 and pursued, since then, a career both as a writer, a songwriter and also as a singer. His third place confirmed the strength of his career.

Other contestants such as the Dominican Fausto rey and the Nicaraguan Carlos Mejía Godoy, went on with their strong musical careers releasing more studio albums and creating music for many more singers.

See also 
 Eurovision Song Contest 1969
 Eurovision Song Contest 1980
 OTI Festival 1978
 OTI Festival 1979

References

External links 
 OTI Festival 1980

OTI Festival by year
1980 in Argentina
Music festivals in Argentina
1980 in music
1980 in Latin music